Borislava Perić-Ranković (born 16 June 1972) is a disabled Serbian table tennis player. She represented Serbia at the 2008, 2012  and 2016 Summer Paralympics in table tennis, winning one gold and three silver medals. She competes in the disability class 4. In the 2016 Summer Paralympics she won her first Paralympic gold medal in the individual class 4 competition, defeating China's Zhang Miao in the finals. At the 2020 Summer Paralympics, she won a bronze medal.

Life 
Perić-Ranković was born in Bečej in 1972. She had a workplace accident in 1994, sustaining spinal cord injuries. She has used a wheelchair ever since. She began training table tennis in 2002, and moved to Novi Sad in 2006 to train with trainer Zlatko Kesler.

She has won one gold, one silver and two bronze medals at the 2010 and 2014 World Para Table Tennis Championships.

In 2015, Perić-Ranković received ITTF Star Award for female para table tennis player of the year.

Perić-Ranković will appear on the Together We Can Do Everything ballot list for the 2022 general election, as an independent candidate.

Notes

1972 births
Serbian female table tennis players
Table tennis players at the 2008 Summer Paralympics
Table tennis players at the 2012 Summer Paralympics
Table tennis players at the 2016 Summer Paralympics
Paralympic table tennis players of Serbia
Medalists at the 2008 Summer Paralympics
Medalists at the 2012 Summer Paralympics
Medalists at the 2016 Summer Paralympics
Paralympic medalists in table tennis
Paralympic gold medalists for Serbia
Paralympic silver medalists for Serbia
Living people
Table tennis players at the 2020 Summer Paralympics
People from Bečej
People with paraplegia